Nathan J. Hochman is an American attorney. He served as United States Assistant Attorney General for the Tax Division of the United States Department of Justice in 2008. Prior to that, Hochman was an Assistant United States Attorney for the Central District of California from 1990 to 1997, serving in the Criminal Division. Hochman also had an extensive career in the private sector, as a partner of several nationwide firms and as a leading expert in tax law, criminal defense, and environmental law. Hochman is currently General Counsel at Browne George Ross O’Brien Annaguey & Ellis.

Hochman was President of the Los Angeles City Ethics Commission from 2011 to 2016.

He was the Republican nominee for the 2022 California Attorney General election.

Early life and career 
Nathan Hochman was born to Bruce Hochman (1929-2011), a US Air Force Veteran who was among the first graduating class of UCLA School of Law and Harriet Hochman, who was an active non-profit leader in Los Angeles.

Hochman graduated from Beverly Hills High School, then earned his Bachelor's degree from Brown University (magna cum laude and Phi Beta Kappa) and his Juris Doctor degree from Stanford Law School.

After graduating, Hochman clerked for United States District Judge Stephen V. Wilson in Los Angeles. Soon after, Hochman became an Assistant US Attorney for the Central District of California. In that role, Hochman prosecuted over 180 cases in the criminal division, securing convictions against corrupt public officials, human and narcotics traffickers, money launderers, and more. Hochman also was the Environmental Crimes Coordinator for two years.

As an Assistant US Attorney, Hochman spearheaded the Los Angeles Disaster Fraud Task Force which was formed in the wake of the 1994 Northridge Earthquake and tasked with prosecuting criminals who defrauded the federal aid programs established for emergency relief.

Hochman has had a successful career as a partner in private practice, gaining national attention and recognition as an industry leading expert in tax law, criminal defense, and environmental law. He was a principal at Hochman, Salkin, Rettig, Toscher & Perez, PC, a law firm founded by his father, Bruce I. Hochman. Hochman joined the firm of Bingham McCutchen, LLP in 2009 as a partner and then became a partner at Morgan, Lewis & Bockius LLP in 2014 when Bingham McCutchen combined with Morgan Lewis. At Morgan Lewis, he was the deputy chair of the White Collar Litigation and Government Investigations practice group. In 2019, Hochman joined the firm of Browne George Ross LLP in its Century City branch office.

United States Assistant Attorney General 
Hochman was appointed by President George W. Bush to serve as United States Assistant Attorney General, overseeing the Tax Division of the United States Department of Justice. He was unanimously confirmed by the United States Senate on December 19, 2007.

As head of the Tax Division, Hochman oversaw the US Government's efforts to enforce federal tax law, particularly focused on bringing justice to individuals involved in tax evasion, offshore tax sheltering, bankruptcy fraud, and overall tax fraud.

Los Angeles Ethics Commission 
Hochman was appointed by Los Angeles City Attorney Carmen Trutanich to serve on the Los Angeles City Ethics Commission and was confirmed unanimously by the Los Angeles City Council.  His term ran from August 2011 to June 2016.  The Los Angeles City Ethics Commission is responsible for administering city and state law with regards to political campaigns, lobbying, contracting, and governmental ethics. As an Ethics Commissioner, Hochman spearheaded a proposal to provide cash incentives to boost voter turnout in special elections in the City of Los Angeles. In 2014, he served as the president of the commission.

Personal life 
Nathan Hochman is married to Vivienne Vella and they have three children together. Hochman is an active community leader and volunteer, serving on the boards or holding leadership positions at Cedars Sinai Medical Center, the Jewish Federation Council of Greater Los Angeles, Stanford Law School, the Brandeis-Bardin Institute, the American Jewish University, the Legal Services Division of the United Jewish Fund, and the Jewish Community Foundation.

References

Beverly Hills High School alumni
Brown University alumni
California Republicans
George W. Bush administration personnel
Lawyers from Los Angeles
Living people
Stanford Law School alumni
United States Assistant Attorneys General
1963 births